The Nankang River, also called the Nanhong River, is a river that flows through Nantou County, Taiwan. Its main tributary is the Mei River. It is an important tributary for the Dadu River. It flows through Taichung City  for 35 km.

Overview
The river flows through the south part of Guoxing Township, through Puli Township, the eastern part of Yuchi Township, and the central-west part of Ren-ai Township.

See also
List of rivers in Taiwan

Rivers of Taiwan
Landforms of Taichung